Alfredo B. Crevenna (22 April 1914 – 30 August 1996) was a Mexican film director and screenwriter. He directed more than 150 films between 1945 and 1995.

Selected filmography
 Neither Blood Nor Sand (1941, screenwriter only)
 The Lady of the Veil (1949)
 Another Spring (1950)
 Traces of the Past (1950)
 Girls in Uniform (1951)
 Talpa (1956)
 Where the Circle Ends (1956) 
 Yambaó (1957)
 Adventure at the Center of the Earth (1965)
 La venus maldita (1967)
 No se mande, profe (1969)
 La Satánica (1973)

References

Bibliography

External links

1914 births
1996 deaths
Mexican film directors
German emigrants to Mexico
Deaths from cancer in Mexico
Film people from Frankfurt
20th-century Mexican screenwriters
20th-century Mexican male writers